Arnold A. Chacón (born 1956) is an American career diplomat who served as acting United States Ambassador to Canada in 2021. He has served as Senior Vice President of the National Defense University since August 2018.

Personal life and education 
Ambassador Chacón grew up in Denver and received a bachelor's degree in international affairs from the University of Colorado in Boulder, Colorado where he attended on a full-ride academic scholarship granted by the Boettcher Foundation. His wife of 30 years, Alida Chacón, is also a member of the U.S. Foreign Service. They have three children.

Career 
A career U.S. Foreign Service officer, he has served in a number of leadership positions in Latin America and Europe, including Deputy Chief of Mission in Madrid, Spain. He has led initiatives to promote free and fair elections, advance respect for human rights, and support the rule of law. While ambassador, Chacón also directed crisis management operations, worked with international partners to combat human trafficking, and advanced regional free trade agreements.

Chacón served as State Department Deputy Executive Director in Washington, D.C., and at the United States Mission to the United Nations. He was a Fellow at the American Political Science Association, and is the recipient of the State Department's Presidential Rank Award and other leadership honors. He speaks Spanish and Italian.

He was the United States Ambassador to Guatemala from August 29, 2011, to March 5, 2014. He was subsequently the Director General of the Foreign Service and Director of Human Resources at the Department of State. He was then detailed from the Department of State to the National Defense University as Senior Vice President.

On May 28, 2021, it was announced that Chacón had been designated as Chargé d’Affaires ad interim at the U.S. Embassy in Ottawa.

References

External links 

 United States Embassy in Guatemala's page

|-

1956 births
Living people
Ambassadors of the United States to Guatemala
Directors General of the United States Foreign Service
Hispanic and Latino American diplomats
People from Denver
University of Colorado alumni
United States Foreign Service personnel
21st-century American diplomats